The 2017–18 Scottish Cup was the 133rd season of Scotland's most prestigious football knockout competition. The tournament was sponsored by bookmaker William Hill in what was the seventh season of a nine-year partnership, after contract negotiations saw the initial five-year contract extended for an additional four years in October 2015.

The defending champions were Celtic who won the 2017 Scottish Cup Final on 27 May 2017.

Calendar
The calendar for the 2017–18 Scottish Cup qualifying rounds, as announced by Scottish Football Association.

Preliminary rounds

The draw for the preliminary rounds took place on Monday, 10 July 2017 at Hampden Park and was made by Scotland internationals Gemma Fay and Ifeoma Dieke.

15 clubs were involved in the draw, of which nine received a bye to the second preliminary round, while the other six entered the first preliminary round. The teams competing in these rounds were made up of teams from the East of Scotland Football League (5), South of Scotland Football League (3), North Caledonian Football League (1), Scottish Junior Football Association (4) and the Scottish Amateur Football Association (2). Glenafton Athletic took part in the Scottish Cup for the first time after winning the 2016–17 West of Scotland Super League Premier Division and the 2016–17 Scottish Junior Cup.

There were three parts to the draw. The first part determined which nine clubs, from the 11 eligible, received a bye to the second preliminary round. The two clubs which did not receive a bye into the second preliminary round entered the first preliminary round. Three ties were then drawn in the first preliminary round to be played on Saturday, 12 August 2017. The final part of the draw saw six ties drawn in the second preliminary round to be played on Saturday, 2 September 2017. Wigtown & Bladnoch were in the draw when it was first announced, but withdrew from the competition before the date of the draw.

Preliminary round one

Draw

Clubs with a valid club licence at the date of the draw are eligible for a bye to the second preliminary round. Teams in Bold advanced to the first round.

The following teams received a bye to the Second Preliminary Round: Banks O’Dee, Coldstream, Girvan,
Glasgow University, Golspie Sutherland, Linlithgow Rose, Preston Athletic, St Cuthbert Wanderers and Threave Rovers.

Matches

Preliminary round two

Matches

Replay

First round

The first round took place on the weekend of 23 September 2017. Along with the six winners from the second preliminary round, there were 30 new entries at this stage, 14 from the Lowland Football League and 16 from the Highland Football League.

Draw
The draw for the first round was made at 5:30 pm on 2 September 2017 at the Excelsior Stadium, Airdrie and was made by Davie Hay, representing defending champions Celtic and Donnie Fergusson from hosts Glasgow University.

Teams in Italics were not known at the time of the draw. Teams in Bold advanced to the second round.

Matches

Replays

Second round

The second round took place on the weekend of 14 October 2017. Along with the 18 winners from the first round, there were 14 new entries at this stage, two from the Lowland Football League, two from the Highland Football League and all 10 from League Two.

Draw

The draw for the second round was made at 17:45 on 23 September 2017 at Ayr Racecourse. The draw was made by former England cricket captain Andrew Flintoff and former Ayr United striker James Grady.

Teams in Italics were not known at the time of the draw. Teams in Bold advanced to the third round.

Matches

Third round
The third round took take place on the weekend of 18 November 2017. Along with the 16 winners from the first round, there were 16 new entries at this stage, all 10 from League One and six from the Championship.

Draw

The draw for the third round was made at 5:45pm on Saturday 14 October 2017 at Links Park, Montrose. The draw was made by Archie Knox and Derek Sim, chairman of Links Park Community Trust. The draw had to be re-done following a mix-up that lead to Brora Rangers being drawn twice. Of the 16 ties, 15 had already been drawn, including Glenafton Athletic-Queen of the South and Brora Rangers-Queen's Park, before the mistake was discovered. The Scottish Football Association claimed that the draw had to be re-done due to "a technical issue" in incident mirroring the 2016 quarter-final draw where when one of the balls containing the club names split open before it was pulled out.

Teams in Bold advanced to the fourth round.

Matches

Replay

Fourth round
The fourth round took place on the weekend of 20 January 2018. Along with the 16 winners from the third round, there were 16 new entries at this stage - the remaining four clubs from the Championship, and all 12 from the Premiership.

Draw
The draw for the fourth round was made at 4:45pm on Monday, 20 November 2017. The draw was made by Doddie Weir and Colin Cameron.

Teams in Bold advanced to the fifth round.

Matches

Replay

Fifth round
The draw for the fifth round was made live on Sky Sports Football at Tynecastle Park following Heart of Midlothian's
Edinburgh derby victory on Sunday, 21 January 2018. The draw was made by Amy MacDonald and David Weir.

Draw
Teams in italics were not known at the time of the draw. Teams in Bold advanced to the quarter-finals.

Matches

Quarter-finals
The draw for the quarter-finals was made live on Sky Sports Football at Pittodrie Stadium following Aberdeen's tie against Dundee United on Sunday, 11 February 2018. The draw was made by Russell Anderson and Rachel Corsie.

Draw
Teams in Bold advanced to the semi-finals.

Matches

Replay

Semi-finals
The draw for the semi-finals was made live on Sky Sports Football at Ibrox Stadium following Rangers' tie against Falkirk on Sunday, 4 March 2018. The draw was made by Neil Alexander and Gordon Reid.

Draw
Teams in italics were not known at the time of the draw. Teams in Bold advanced to the final.

Matches

Final

Bracket
The following is the bracket which the Scottish Cup resembled. Numbers in parentheses next to the match score represent the results of a replay.

Media coverage
From round four onwards, selected matches from the Scottish Cup are broadcast live in the UK and Ireland by BBC Scotland and Sky Sports. BBC Scotland has the option to show one tie per round, with Sky Sports showing two ties per round with one replay; Sky Sports show both semi-finals live with one also on BBC Scotland, and both channels screen the final live.

The following matches are to be broadcast live on UK television:

References

2017–18 in Scottish football cups
2017–18
2017–18 European domestic association football cups